West Smethwick Park is a public park in the St Pauls ward of Smethwick, England. It opened on 7 September 1895.

Smethwick – and thus the park – was traditionally in Staffordshire, but has been administrated by Sandwell Metropolitan Borough Council, as part of the West Midlands county, since 1974.

In June 2015, it was announced that a £4.8 million Heritage Lottery Fund grant had been reserved for the park, subject to final approval. It would allow for the restoration of the pavilion, bandstand and memorials.

Memorials 
The park features a memorial, in brick and terracotta, with a bronze bust, to Sir James Timmins Chance, a partner in the nearby glass-making firm, Chance Brothers. Chance purchased the land for the park. Beneath the bust is a plaque reading:

A stone drinking fountain commemorates John Chance, chairman of Chance Brothers, who died in November 1900. There is also a memorial to Flight Sergeants Cox and Preston, who crashed nearby on 31 July 1944, during World War II.

References 

Parks and open spaces in the West Midlands (county)
1895 in England
Smethwick